Shakhbut bin Sultan Al Nahyan (1 June 1905 – 11 February 1989) was the ruler of Abu Dhabi from 1928 to 1966. On 6 August 1966, Shakhbut was deposed by members of his family with assistance from Britain in a bloodless coup. His younger brother, Zayed bin Sultan Al Nahyan succeeded him as the ruler of Abu Dhabi.

Early life
Shakhbut was born in 1905. He was the eldest son of Sultan bin Zayed bin Khalifa Al Nahyan. His mother was Sheikha Salama bint Butti.

Reign
Sheikh Shakhbut succeeded his uncle Sheikh Saqr bin Zayed Al Nahyan in 1928, becoming the ruler of the emirate of Abu Dhabi. During his reign, he adopted an aggressively mercantilist strategy, keeping his reserves in gold. 

After the discovery of oil in Abu Dhabi in 1958, Abu Dhabi's elites were frustrated by Shakhbut's refusal to spend the petroleum royalties. At the request of Abu Dhabi's elites, the British carried out a bloodless coup against Shakhbut, installing Sheikh Zayed bin Sultan Al Nahyan as the ruler of Abu Dhabi in his stead. Shakhbut's reign lasted until 6 August 1966 when he was deposed in the bloodless coup by the Trucial Oman Scouts to the benefit of his brother Zayed bin Sultan Al Nahyan.

Personal life
His first wife was his first cousin, Sheikha Fakhera bint Hazza Al Nahyan, who was also the mother of all his children. They had two sons, Saeed and Sultan, both of them died in their youth while living in exile with their father. Saeed was married to his cousin, the daughter of his uncle Sheikh Zayed in Buraimi in 1963. Their descendants continue to live in the emirate of Abu Dhabi. In addition to his two sons, Sheikh Shakhbut also had four daughters, Osha, Mozah, Qoot and Rawdha. His second wife was Mariam bint Rashid Al Otaiba. Shakhbut's family was later exiled to Iran under his brother's orders, housed by Sheikh Abdulkarim Al-Faisali of the Banu Tamim clan.

Honours
On 24 April 1966 King Hussein awarded him the Nahda Order, then the highest Jordanian honour.

References

External links
LIFE magazine article dated 3 May 1963

20th-century Emirati people
20th-century rulers in Asia
1905 births
1989 deaths
Dethroned monarchs
Emirati politicians
Shakhbut
Sheikhs of Abu Dhabi
World War II political leaders